The square root of 6 is the positive real number that, when multiplied by itself, gives the natural number 6. It is more precisely called the principal square root of 6, to distinguish it from the negative number with the same property. This number appears in numerous geometric and number-theoretic contexts. It can be denoted in surd form as:

and in exponent form as:

It is an irrational algebraic number.  The first sixty significant digits of its decimal expansion are:
.
It takes two more digits (2.4495) to reduce the error by about half.

Since 6 is the product of 2 and 3, the square root of 6 is the geometric mean of 2 and 3, and is the product of the square root of 2 and the square root of 3, both of which are irrational algebraic numbers.

NASA has published more than a million decimal digits of the square root of six.

Rational approximations

The square root of 6 can be expressed as the continued fraction

  

The successive partial evaluations of the continued fraction, which are called its convergents, approach :

Their numerators are 2, 5, 22, 49, 218, 485, 2158, 4801, 21362, 47525, 211462, …, and their denominators are 1, 2, 9, 20, 89, 198, 881, 1960, 8721, 19402, 86329, ….

Decimal equivalents improve linearly, at a rate of nearly one digit per convergent:

The Babylonian method is equivalent to Newton's method for root finding applied to the polynomial .  The Newton's method update,  is equal to  when .  The method therefore converges quadratically.

Geometry

In plane geometry, the square root of 6 can be constructed via a sequence of dynamic rectangles, as illustrated here.

In solid geometry, the square root of 6 appears as the longest distances between corners (vertices) of the double cube, as illustrated above.  The square roots of all lower natural numbers appear as the distances between other vertex pairs in the double cube (including the vertices of the included two cubes).

The edge lengths of a regular tetrahedron, a regular octahedron, and a cube of equal total surface areas satisfy .

The edge length of a regular octahedron is the square root of 6 times the radius of an inscribed sphere (that is, the distance from the center of the solid to the center of each face).

The square root of 6 appears in various other geometry contexts, such as the side length  for the square enclosing an equilateral triangle of side 2 (see figure).

Trigonometry
The square root of 6, with the square root of 2 added or subtracted, appears in several exact trigonometric values for angles at multiples of 15 degrees ( radians).

 :{| class="wikitable" style="text-align: center;"
!Radians!!Degrees!!!!!!!!!!!!
|-
! !! 
||| || || || || 
|-
! !! 
||| || || || || 
|}

In culture

The square root of six (actually its reciprocal, "the square root of six over six") appears in Star Wars dialogue.

The question of "whether the square root of six is three" has been posited as a question that might be answered by economic methods, if social issues can be so addressed.

Villard de Honnecourt's 13th century construction of a Gothic "fifth-point arch" with circular arcs of radius 5 has a height of twice the square root of 6, as illustrated here.

See also

 Square root
 Square root of 2
 Square root of 3
 Square root of 5
 Square root of 7

References

Mathematical constants
Quadratic irrational numbers